The 1980 French Grand Prix was a Formula One motor race held at Paul Ricard on 29 June 1980. It was the seventh round of the 1980 Formula One season. The race was the 58th French Grand Prix, or the 66th Grand Prix de l'ACF and the sixth to be held at Paul Ricard. The race was held over 54 laps of the 5.809-kilometre circuit for a total race distance of 314 kilometres.

Controversy

Originally the race was the eighth round of the season but moved up the order after the Spanish Grand Prix was removed from the schedule as a consequence of the first major confrontation between FISA and FOCA. The controversy threatened to spill over into the French Grand Prix as well as the FISA aligned teams, primarily Ferrari, Renault and Alfa Romeo, had boycotted the Spanish race which later saw its results removed from championship considerations. The two camps came to an agreement in time for the French Grand Prix to not be affected.

Results

The race was won by Alan Jones driving a Williams FW07B. The win was Jones' seventh Formula One Grand Prix victory and his third of the year. Jones was entering a period of good form having won the Spanish Grand Prix four weeks earlier. Jones won by four seconds over French driver Didier Pironi driving a Ligier JS11/15. Third was Pironi's French teammate Jacques Laffite. Laffite had led for much of the race until his tyres lost condition. The large French contingent had dominated proceedings with the all-French teams Renault and Ligier taking up four of the top six grid positions with only Jones and his Williams teammate Carlos Reutemann intervening. Jean-Pierre Jabouille's Renault RE20 broke its transmission at the start and Jones picked his way past Pironi then the second Renault of René Arnoux before finally catching Laffite on lap 34.

Arnoux faded to fifth behind Nelson Piquet (Brabham BT49) with throttle problems with Reutemann taking the final point in sixth. The win saw Jones move back into the championship lead passing Arnoux and Piquet. Jones now led Piquet by three points and Arnoux by five. Pironi was now equal with Arnoux.

Williams now led Ligier by five points, unchanged from Monaco thanks to the efforts of all four drivers and Brabham increased the gap over Renault in third and fourth.

Shadow Racing Cars

This race also saw the final appearance of Shadow Racing Cars. Geoff Lees and David Kennedy were 25th and 27th in qualifying in the Shadow DN12s meaning both drivers missed the 24-car grid. The team had been sold only two months previously to Macau-based businessman and motor racing team owner Teddy Yip. Yip's own race team Theodore Racing would emerge as a Formula One team in 1981.

Classification

Qualifying

Race

Championship standings after the race

Drivers' Championship standings

Constructors' Championship standings

Note: Only the top five positions are included for both sets of standings.

References

French Grand Prix
French Grand Prix
Grand Prix